Next Generation poets (2014) are a list of poets named in 2014 by a panel for the Poetry Book Society, which once every ten years selects 20 poets "expected to dominate the poetry landscape of the coming decade." The accolade highlights emerging poets in the UK and Ireland who published a first collection of poetry within the previous decade. 

The judges who compiled the list were: poet and broadcaster Ian McMillan (chair), poet and playwright Caroline Bird; Robert Crawford, from the 1994 New Generation Poets list; poet Clare Pollard; and Paul Farley, one of 2004's Next Generation Poets list. The British Council collaborated with the Poetry Book Society on an international showcase of the chosen poets.

The Next Generation 2014 list comprises:

Tara Bergin
Emily Berry
Sean Borodale
Adam Foulds
Annie Freud
Alan Gillis
Rebecca Goss
Jen Hadfield
Emma Jones
Luke Kennard
Melissa Lee-Houghton
Hannah Lowe
Kei Miller
Helen Mort
Daljit Nagra
Heather Phillipson
Kae Tempest
Mark Waldron
Sam Willetts
Jane Yeh

See also
 New Generation poets (1994)
 Next Generation poets (2004)

References

External links
 Official website
 Charlotte Runcie, "Is this really poetry's next generation?" The Telegraph, 11 September 2014.

British poetry
British literary movements